Turkey competed at the 2013 World Championships in Athletics from August 10 to August 18 in Moscow, Russia.
A team of 10 athletes was
announced to represent the country
in the event.

Results

Men

Track events

Field events

Women

Road and track events

Field events

References

Nations at the 2013 World Championships in Athletics
2013 in Turkish sport
2013